The Port Washington Water Pollution Control District (abbreviated as PWWPCD) is a public sewer district in Nassau County, on Long Island, in New York, United States. It serves the Greater Port Washington area of Long Island's North Shore.

History 
The Port Washington Water Pollution Control District was established in 1915. As of 2021, more than 28,000 residents and business in the Port Washington area are served by the district.

Over the decades following its establishment, the district would be expanded as new developments were built or as requested by residents in areas without sewers. One such extension took place in the 1950s, shortly after the construction of the New Salem and Westgate sections of Port Washington.

In 1968, the Port Washington Water Pollution Control District received funds from New York to upgrade and expand its sewage pumping station. The grant, worth $361,218 (1968 USD), was part of the Pure Waters program.

In 2016, a $450,000 grant from New York was secured for connecting the North Hempstead Beach Park's sewer system to the sewer system operated by the Port Washington Water Pollution Control District. At the time the $1.8 million project was announced, the park's sewer system was in poor condition and was over 40 years old.

Statistics 

 Sewer network type: gravity-based; activated sludge.
 Number of pumping stations: 17.
 Plant design capacity: 4.0 million gallons/day.

 Notable users: Notable non-residential users include the Pall Corporation Headquarters in Port Washington and St. Francis Hospital in Flower Hill.

Additionally, the Port Washington Water Pollution Control District is separate from the Nassau County Sewage System.

Communities served 

 Baxter Estates (partial service)
 Flower Hill (partial service)
 Manorhaven (under contract; the PWWPCD treats sewage conveyed by the village from that village's pumping system)
 Port Washington
 Port Washington North

District board 
As of August 2021, the Superintendent of the Port Washington Water Pollution Control District is Windsor J. Kinney, and the Board of Commissioners consists of Donald A. Kurz, Melanie Cassens, and Arduino Marinelli.

References

External links 

 Official website

Town of North Hempstead, New York
Sewer districts in Nassau County, New York
Sewerage infrastructure in the United States